The Mitchell U-2 Superwing is an American tailless ultralight aircraft that was designed by Don Mitchell for amateur construction.

Design and development
Although the aircraft was designed before the US FAR 103 Ultralight Vehicles rules came into force, the U-2 Superwing complies with them anyway (including the category's maximum empty weight of ). It features a cantilever mid-wing, a single-seat enclosed cockpit, tricycle landing gear and a single engine in pusher configuration. The U-2 is a development of the high-wing B-10.

The aircraft fuselage is made from welded steel tube, while the wing is of wood and foam, with doped aircraft fabric covering. Its  span wing employs a modified Wortmann FX05-191 airfoil. The flight controls are unconventional; pitch and roll are controlled by elevons and yaw is controlled by the wing tip rudders. The main landing gear has suspension and the nose wheel is steerable and equipped with a brake.

The U-2 can accept a variety of engines ranging from  mounted in pusher configuration.

Specifications (U-2)

See also

References

External links 

 US Pacific; Current supplier of Mitchell Wing plans
 AmeriPlanes former manufacturer of Mitchell Wing kits - website archives on Archive.org

1970s United States ultralight aircraft
Don Mitchell aircraft
Tailless aircraft
Aircraft first flown in 1980
Single-engined pusher aircraft